Golara Nij is a village in Patashpur I CD block in Contai subdivision of Purba Medinipur district in the state of West Bengal, India.

Geography

Location

Urbanisation
96.96% of the population of Egra subdivision live in the rural areas. Only 3.04% of the population live in the urban areas, and that is the lowest proportion of urban population amongst the four subdivisions in Purba Medinipur district.

Note: The map alongside presents some of the notable locations in the subdivision. All places marked in the map are linked in the larger full screen map.

Demographics
As per 2011 Census of India Golara Nij had a total population of 3,001 of which 1,542 (51%) were males and 1,459 (49%) were females. Population below 6 years was 278. The total number of literates in Golara Nij was 2,327 (85.46% of the population over 6 years).

Transport
Golara Nij is on Egra-Bajkul Road.

Education
The nearest degree college, Yogoda Satsanga Palpara Mahavidyalaya at Palpara, was established in 1964.

Healthcare
Gonara Block Primary Health Centre at Golara Nij, PO Manglamaro (with 10 beds) is the main medical facility in Patashpur I CD block. There is a primary health centre at Borhat, PO Katranka (with 6 beds).

References

Villages in Purba Medinipur district